Uttarer Khep is a 2000 Bangladeshi drama film directed by Shahjahan Chowdhury and starring Champa and Manna in lead roles. Champa earned a Bangladesh National Film Award for Best Actress for her role. The film is based on the same name novel of Shawkat Ali.

Cast
 Champa
 Manna
 Chitralekha Guho
 Pijush Bandyopadhyay
 Tushar Khan

Music

References

External links
 

2000 films
Bengali-language Bangladeshi films
Films scored by Sheikh Sadi Khan
2000s Bengali-language films
Films based on the Bangladesh Liberation War
Films based on Bangladeshi novels